WECF may refer to:
Women Engage for a Common Future, formerly named Women Engage for a Common Future
World Evangelical Congregational Fellowship, a global association of evangelical Christian Congregational Churches

See also
WCF (disambiguation)